Lucian Howard Cocke (March 27, 1858 – November 14, 1927) was an American lawyer, politician, historian and university rector from Virginia.

Life

Cocke was born at Hollins College in Roanoke, Virginia where his father, Charles Lewis Cocke, was founder and president.  His mother was Susanna Pleasants, a cousin of Virginia governor James Pleasants.  His early education was under the tutelage of Hollins College professors.  He eventually matriculated to Richmond College (now University of Richmond) but finished his bachelor's degree at Washington & Lee. He attended law school at the University of Virginia and upon graduating set up his own practice. In 1884, he joined into a partnership in Richmond forming the firm Penn & Cocke, after the retirement of Penn he formed a new partnership in Cocke & Glasgow. He was the first Democrat elected mayor of Roanoke, Virginia. From 1924 to 1928, he served as rector and trustee of his alma mater Washington & Lee.  In private life, he was an avid author of works on the law, history and genealogy periodically contributing to the Virginia Historical Society and the William & Mary Quarterly.

Family

Cocke married twice, first on September 17, 1885 to his distant cousin Lelia Maria Smith (1859–1899) a descendant of Robert "King" Carter and William Thornton. He and Smith had four children. After her death he married secondly in 1903, Sarah Cobb Johnson (1865–1944) a native of Alabama and the granddaughter of John Addison Cobb and descendant of Ambrose Cobbs and Thomas Reade Rootes.  They had no children.

References

1858 births
1927 deaths
Mayors of Roanoke, Virginia
Washington and Lee University alumni
University of Virginia School of Law alumni
Virginia Democrats
Pleasants family